Pels may refer to:

People
 Andries Pels (1655–1731), a Dutch banker and insurer
 Gerrit Pels (1893–1966), a Dutch astronomer
 1667 Pels, a main-belt asteroid
 Jessica Pels (born 1986), American magazine editor
 Pels Rijcken (1810–1889), a Royal Dutch Navy officer and politician

Other uses
 New Orleans Pelicans, or "Pels", an American baseball team

See also

 Pel (disambiguation)
 PEN/Laura Pels Theater Award, an award for playwrights